Cadherin-17 is a protein that in humans is encoded by the CDH17 gene.

This gene is a member of the cadherin superfamily, genes encoding calcium-dependent, membrane-associated glycoproteins. The encoded protein is cadherin-like, consisting of an extracellular region, containing 7 cadherin domains, and a transmembrane region but lacking the conserved cytoplasmic domain. The protein is a component of the gastrointestinal tract and pancreatic ducts, acting as an intestinal proton-dependent peptide transporter in the first step in oral absorption of many medically important peptide-based drugs. The protein may also play a role in the morphological organization of liver and intestine.

References

Further reading

External links